Aristotelia epicharta is a moth of the family Gelechiidae. It was described by Turner in 1919. It is found in Australia, where it has been recorded from New South Wales.

The wingspan is about 9 mm. The forewings are whitish sparsely irrorated with fuscous and with an ochreous streak irrorated with fuscous on the costa from the middle to three-fourths, giving off at its extremity a transverse fascia to the tornus, interrupted in the middle. There is also an ochreous terminal line and the terminal edge is irrorated with blackish. A blackish dot is found at the apex. The hindwings are whitish-grey.

References

Moths described in 1919
Aristotelia (moth)
Moths of Australia